East Glisan Pizza Lounge is a pizzeria in Portland, Oregon.

Description 
East Glisan Pizza Lounge is a pizzeria on Northeast Glisan Street in Portland's Montavilla neighborhood. As of 2014, the menu offered ten types of pizza, five appetizers, and three salads. One pizza has broccoli rapini and garlic oil and another has capicola with provolone, fennel, and Mama Lil's peppers. Appetizers include chickpea fritters and pork meatballs with tomato and Parmesan. Cocktails, beers, and wines are also available.

As of 2017, East Glisan offered Detroit-style pizza on Tuesdays.

History 
Chef Vallery Markel opened the restaurant in 2014, in a two-room space which previously housed a Mexican restaurant. Willamette Week Martin Cizmar said of the interior and atmorsphere: "The dimly lit East Glisan is indeed a lounge. Roughly half the seating is bar stools or couches, and the front sidewalk is home to a fleet of those rugged wooden picnic tables where smokers huddle outside Portland dive bars. It's all '90s classics on the radio: early Wilco and Liz Phair, midcareer Whitney Houston and Tina Turner."

For Pizza Week in 2014, Markel and Adam Sappington, the chef and owner of The Country Cat, collaborated with Markel to create the 'Country Cat Pizza'. The balsamic-braised bacon pizza, available for one week, had roasted butternut squash puree, goat cheese, and arugula.

Detroit-style pizza was added to the menu in 2016.  Kristen Martha Brown is the owner, as of 2017.

Reception 

Andrea Damewood of the Portland Mercury said East Glisan's pizzas "are a solid addition to the area, and good enough for those of us who live west of César E. Chávez Blvd. to cheat on our own favorite spot at least a few times". Her review said, "Despite small flaws, East Glisan should definitely be on the list for both pizza completists and those looking to satisfy a carnal desire for melty cheese, meat, and bread." Martin Cizmar included East Glisan in Willamette Week'''s 2017 list of the city's six best restaurants for Detroit-style pizza. The newspaper also included East Glisan in a 2017 list of "The Best Bar Pizzas in Portland" and said Brown had "one of the best little pizzerias around" with "the best Detroit pies in town". Michael Russell ranked East Glisan number ten on The Oregonian'' 2018 list of Portland's top ten pizzerias. Alex Frane included East Glisan in Thrillist's 2020 overview of "The Absolute Best Pizza in Portland".

See also

 Pizza in Portland, Oregon

References

External links 

 
 East Glisan Pizza Lounge at Zomato

2014 establishments in Oregon
Montavilla, Portland, Oregon
Northeast Portland, Oregon
Pizzerias in Portland, Oregon
Restaurants established in 2014